Ian Gardner Maxwell (born 2 May 1975) is a Scottish football executive and former player who is currently the Chief Executive of the Scottish Football Association.

Playing career
Born in Glasgow, Maxwell started his career with Queen's Park and played at Hampden Park for five years before moving to Ross County in 1998. He was part of the Staggies team that won the 1998–99 Scottish Third Division and then finished third in the 1999–2000 Scottish Second Division to secure a second consecutive promotion. He signed for St Johnstone in 2002, playing in the Scottish First Division for three more seasons before signing for First Division rivals St Mirren in 2005.

Maxwell played in defence and was part of the St Mirren side which won the Scottish First Division title in the 2005–06 season. In May 2008, having played in 33 Scottish Premier League games across two seasons, he moved back to the First Division with Partick Thistle but was released at the end of the 2009–10 season.

Administrative career
A few weeks later he was back at Thistle, as assistant manager to Ian McCall. After McCall stepped down as Thistle manager in April 2011, Jackie McNamara and Simon Donnelly took control of the team, while Maxwell became the general manager. He was promoted to the position of managing director in 2014.

In April 2018, the Scottish Football Association announced that Maxwell would be appointed as their chief executive at the end of the 2017–18 season.

See also
List of footballers in Scotland by number of league appearances (500+)

References

External links

Ian Maxwell at LinkedIn 

1975 births
Living people
Footballers from Glasgow
Scottish footballers
Alumni of Glasgow Caledonian University
Scottish Premier League players
Scottish Football League players
Queen's Park F.C. players
Ross County F.C. players
St Johnstone F.C. players
St Mirren F.C. players
Partick Thistle F.C. players
Partick Thistle F.C. non-playing staff
Directors of football clubs in Scotland
Chief executives of the Scottish Football Association
Association football defenders